Pleasant Grove is a rural farming unincorporated community in Houston County, Texas.  It is located six miles from Lovelady off State Highway 19. It was established after the Civil War. A school was built in 1857. By the 1990s, the town was dispersed, although the church with several members still remains.

References

Unincorporated communities in Houston County, Texas
Unincorporated communities in Texas